Ripartitella is a genus of fungi in the family Agaricaceae. The genus was circumscribed by Rolf Singer in Mycologia vol.39 on page 85 in 1947.

The genus name of Ripartitella is in honour of Jean Baptiste Marie Joseph Solange Eugène Ripart (1815–1878), who was a French physician, botanist and mycologist.

Species
As accepted by Species Fungorum;
Ripartitella alba 
Ripartitella brasiliensis 
Ripartitella brunnea 
Ripartitella sipariana 
Ripartitella squamosidisca 

Former species;
 R. ponderosa  = Cercopemyces ponderosus
 R. rickenii  = Cercopemyces rickenii

See also
List of Agaricales genera
List of Agaricaceae genera

References

External links

Agaricaceae
Taxa named by Rolf Singer